Eargo is an American hearing aid manufacturer based in San Jose, California.

History

Eargo was founded in 2010 by Florent Michel, his son Raphael Michel, and Daniel Shen. Florent—an ear, nose, and throat surgeon—serves as the designer and inventor while Raphael served as the company's first CEO and Shen as the company's chief science & clinical officer. In 2013, they received seed funding  from a range of seed funds and angels as well as Maveron. In June 2015, they received $13.6 million in Series A funding from a group of 9 investors, including Maveron, Crosslink Capital, Dolby Family Ventures, and Birchmere Ventures.

Eargo announced $25 million in Series B funding led by New Enterprise Associates in December 2015, and in October 2017 closed the first tranche of Series C funding intended to raise $45m. There were other subsequent rounds of funding including a $52M series-D in 2019 and a $71M series-E in mid 2020.

Eargo filed for IPO on September 25, 2020 and officially listed on NASDAQ on October 16, 2020.

in June 2015, Eargo launched the first hearing devices available for order. The Eargo Plus was introduced in 2017 and, in 2018, the Eargo Max was introduced. The Eargo Neo launched in 2019, and in 2020 the Eargo Neo HiFi was launched .

Products

Eargo hearing aids are certified Class 2 medical devices. Their design is modeled after the standard fishing fly, with a small speaker surrounded by medical-grade silicone fibers (for which the company uses the trademark Flexi Fibers).; the fibers allow natural bass sounds to flow more freely into the ear canal, so that only treble ranges require amplification.

The devices come in two sizes and are pre-programmed with four standard profiles. To change the setting, wearers double-tap their ear, and an acoustic switch changes the sound profile. The settings for the devices in each ear can be changed independently. Users can also send their personal audiograms to licensed hearing professionals at Eargo who will custom-calibrate the device for that individual's specific needs. The hearing aids can be charged using a portable charging device that is sold with them, and are designed to hold a charge for up to 16 hours. The charging device itself is designed to last up to a week on a single charge.

 
The company's founders have stated that these devices are designed with younger people in mind to overcome the stigma surrounding standard, bulky hearing aids. The product designer is Ammunition Design Group, which modeled the shape of the charger on a river rock and designed it for ease of use and high visibility of the hearing aids within; the company logo is based on a visualization of a digital recording of Florent Michel saying "Eargo".

References

External links

American companies established in 2010
Health care companies established in 2010
Health care companies based in California
Companies based in Mountain View, California
Hearing aid manufacturers
Medical technology companies of the United States
Companies listed on the Nasdaq
2010 establishments in California
2020 initial public offerings